Peer instruction is an evidence-based, interactive teaching method popularized by Harvard Professor Eric Mazur in the early 1990s. Originally used in many schools, including introductory undergraduate physics classes at Harvard University, peer instruction is used in various disciplines and institutions around the globe. It is a student-centered approach that involves flipping the traditional classroom by moving information transfer out and moving information assimilation, or application of learning, into the classroom. There is some research that supports the effectiveness of peer instruction over more traditional teaching methods, such as traditional lecture.

Peer instruction as a learning system involves students preparing to learn outside of class by doing pre-class readings and answering questions about those readings using another method, called Just in Time Teaching. Then, in class, the instructor engages students by posing prepared conceptual questions or ConcepTests that are based on student difficulties. The questioning procedure outlined by Eric Mazur is as follows:
 Instructor poses question based on students' responses to their pre-class reading
 Students reflect on the question
 Students commit to an individual answer
 Instructor reviews student responses
 Students discuss their thinking and answers with their peers
 Students then commit again to an individual answer
 The instructor again reviews responses and decides whether more explanation is needed before moving on to the next concept. 

Peer instruction is now used in a range of educational institutions around the globe and in many other disciplines, including philosophy, psychology, geology, mathematics, computer science and engineering.

References

Evidence-based practices
Educational practices